The 12983/84 – Garib Express is a Superfast Express train of Garib Rath class belonging to Indian Railways – North Western Railways zone that runs between Ajmer and Chandigarh in India.

It operates as train number 12983 from Ajmer to Chandigarh and as train number 12984 in the reverse direction.

On introduction, it would run between  & Chandigarh. Later it was extended to Ajmer.

Coaches

The 12983/84 Ajmer–Chandigarh Garib Express presently has 12 AC 3 tier coaches along with 2 EOG cars.

As with most train services in India, coach composition may be amended at the discretion of Indian Railways depending on demand.

Service

The 12983 Ajmer–Chandigarh Garib Express covers the distance of 740 kilometres in 12 hours 50 mins (57.66 km/hr) & in 12 hrs 30 mins as 12984 Chandigarh–Ajmer Garib Express (59.20 km/hr).

As the average speed of the train is above 55 km/hr, as per Indian Railways rules, its fare includes a Superfast surcharge.

Routeing

The 12983/84 Ajmer–Chandigarh Garib Express runs via , Alwar, Bhiwani, Rohtak,  to Chandigarh.

Traction

As the entire route is not yet electrified, a Ratlam or Abu Road-based WDM-3A engine powers the train for its entire journey.

Time Table

12983 Ajmer–Chandigarh Garib Express leaves Ajmer every Tuesday, Friday & Sunday at 17:55 hrs IST and reaches  at 06:45 hrs IST the next day.

12984 Chandigarh–jmer Garib Express leaves Chandigarh every Monday, Wednesday & Saturday at 21:10 hrs IST and reaches Ajmer at 09:40 hrs IST the next day.

External links

References 

Transport in Ajmer
Rail transport in Chandigarh
Railway services introduced in 2009
Rail transport in Haryana
Rail transport in Rajasthan
Garib Rath Express trains